Ivanivka is an urban-type settlement in Henichesk Raion, Kherson Oblast, southern Ukraine. It is located inland, north of Henichesk and west of Melitopol. Ivanivka hosts the administration of Ivanivka settlement hromada, one of the hromadas of Ukraine. It has a population of

Administrative status 
Until 18 July, 2020, Ivanivka was the administrative center of Ivanivka Raion. The raion was abolished in July 2020 as part of the administrative reform of Ukraine, which reduced the number of raions of Kherson Oblast to five. The area of Ivanivka Raion was merged into Henichesk Raion.

Economy

Transportation
Ivanivka has access to the Highway M14 connecting Kherson with Mariupol via Melitopol. There is a paved road to Henichesk as well.

See also 

 Russian occupation of Kherson Oblast

References

Urban-type settlements in Henichesk Raion